Port Jervis City School District (PJCSD) is an American school district headquartered in Port Jervis, New York. The district runs four schools, 2 elementary schools, 1 middle school, and one high school. The district's students come from Port Jervis and sections of Deerpark, including Sparrow Bush, in Orange County. It also serves sections of Forestburgh and Mamakating in Sullivan County.

History
In 2017, the school board decided to remove Tom Bongiovi as superintendent, with a severance of almost $299,262; Bongiovi left on July 25, 2017. By 2018, the school board had selected Mike Rydell as the new superintendent.

On July 19, 2022, Port Jervis City School District held a meeting where it named John Bell the new superintendent. Previously, Bell had served as the superintendent of the nearby Delaware Valley School District from 2012 to 2022. He also graduated from Port Jervis High School, The High School run by the district, in 1985.

Demographics
From circa 1928, the Montague Township School District of Montague Township, New Jersey sent its high school-aged students to Port Jervis High School; the Montague district was the only New Jersey school district to send its students outside of New Jersey to complete certain grade levels. The district also sent middle school-aged students to Port Jervis Middle School. In 2013, the Montague district decided to begin sending its students to High Point Regional High School instead, effective September 2014. Some parents had sought to continue sending their children to Port Jervis High, so High Point officials were looking into possible agreements related to that. By 2017, all grade levels for high school students were to be sent to High Point. The Montague District also began housing middle school students at the Montague School.

As a result, the Port Jervis District was projected to lose $1,800,000 by 2018 towards lost tuition fees that were previously paid by Montague Township. The Port Jervis district planned to spread the impact of the tuition loss across several fiscal years. By 2016 the Montague district owed the Port Jervis district $441,327 in tuition, causing the latter to sue the former.

The district had stated in its 2019-2020 profile that "the community has a relatively low socioeconomic status".

In 2013, the district had 128 students enrolled at the secondary level who were from Montague Township, New Jersey.

Schools
 Port Jervis High School (Deerpark, with a Port Jervis postal address) 
 Port Jervis Middle School (Port Jervis)
 Hamilton Bicentennial Elementary School (Cuddebackville, Deerpark)
 Anna S. Kuhl Elementary School (Deerpark, with a Port Jervis postal address)

Anna S. Kuhl and Port Jervis High are on the same property.

References

External links
 Port Jervis City School District

School districts in New York (state)
Education in Orange County, New York
Education in Sullivan County, New York
Education in Sussex County, New Jersey